Karaman Eyalet was one of the subdivisions of the Ottoman Empire.

In 1468, the formerly independent principality of Karaman was annexed by the Ottomans; Mehmed II appointed his son Mustafa as governor of the new eyalet, with his seat at Konya.

Administrative divisions
The eyalet consisted of seven sanjaks between 1700 and 1740: Konya, Niğde, Kayseri, Kırşehir, Beyşehir, Aksaray, and Akşehir.

References

See also
 Karaman Province

Eyalets of the Ottoman Empire in Anatolia
History of Aksaray Province
History of Karaman Province
History of Kayseri Province
History of Kırşehir Province
History of Konya Province
History of Nevşehir Province
History of Niğde Province
1483 establishments in the Ottoman Empire
1864 disestablishments in the Ottoman Empire